Bierman or Biermann is a surname.  The genealogy of the Dutch family Bierman is published in the Nederland's Patriciaat (in Dutch)

Notable people with surname Bierman or Biermann:

Adolph Biermann (1842–1914), an American politician
Bernie Bierman (1894–1977), an American college football coach
Bernie Bierman (1908–2012), an American Tin Pan Alley composer
Charlie Bierman (1845–1879), an American baseball player
Fred Biermann (1884–1968), a U.S. Representative from Iowa
Hugo Biermann (1916–2012), a South African military commander
Kroy Biermann (born 1985), an American football player for the Atlanta Falcons
Ludwig Biermann (1907–1986), a German astronomer
Nick Bierman (1910–1977), a South African military commander
Robert Bierman, a British film and television director
Ronnie Bierman (1938–1984), a Dutch film and television actress
Wolf Biermann (born 1936), a German singer and songwriter

See also

 Biermans, a defunct Belgian printing company
 Birman (disambiguation), a similar surname.